Estádio do CD das Aves is a multi-use stadium in Vila das Aves, Portugal.  It is currently used mostly for football matches and is the home ground of Clube Desportivo das Aves.  The stadium holds 8,560 people and was built in 1981.

It underwent many renovations during the new millennium especially in the year 2000, when Desportivo das Aves gained promotion to the Primeira Liga for the second time in their history.  When the stadium was built, there were 12,500 seats available, but it currently seats only 8,560 after the club decided to remove some of its seats.

The France national football team used the stadium as a training ground in preparation for UEFA Euro 2004.  France reached the quarter final stage of the competition after being knocked out of the tournament by eventual winners Greece thanks to a goal by Angelos Charisteas.

References

External links
 Profile at ForaDeJogo
 Profile at ZeroZero

CD das Aves

C.D. Aves
Sports venues in Porto District
Sports venues completed in 1981